Girokomeio or Girokomio, meaning 'nursing home' is a neighborhood of Athens, Greece.

It is named for the large old people's nursing home in the area.

Transport
Panormou metro station on Line 3 of the Athens Metro is the closest station.

References

Neighbourhoods in Athens